Tillandsia fragrans, synonym Vriesea fragrans, is a species of flowering plant in the family Bromeliaceae, native to north-west South America (Colombia, Ecuador, Venezuela). It was first described by Édouard André in 1888.

References

fragrans
Flora of Colombia
Flora of Ecuador
Flora of Venezuela
Plants described in 1888